The year 1884 in science and technology involved some significant events, listed below.

Chemistry
 October 14 – George Eastman is granted his first patents for photographic roll film in the United States.
 J. H. van 't Hoff proposes the Arrhenius equation for the temperature dependence of the reaction rate constant, and therefore, rate of a chemical reaction.
 Hermann Emil Fischer proposes the structure of purine, a key component in many biomolecules, which he synthesizes in 1898; he also begins work on the chemistry of glucose and related sugars.
 Henry Louis Le Chatelier develops Le Chatelier's principle, which explains the response of dynamic chemical equilibria to external stresses.

Mathematics
 Georg Cantor introduces the Cantor function.
 Gottlob Frege publishes Die Grundlagen der Arithmetik ("The Foundations of Arithmetic") presenting a theory of logicism.
 Edwin Abbott Abbott (as "A Square") publishes Flatland: A Romance of Many Dimensions, a mathematical novella.

Medicine
 Dr Takaki Kanehiro of the Imperial Japanese Navy conducts a controlled experiment demonstrating that deficient diet is the cause of beriberi, but mistakenly concludes that sufficient protein alone would prevent it.
 Georg Theodor Gaffky isolates the pathogenic bacillus salmonella typhi as the cause of typhoid fever.
 Robert Koch and Friedrich Loeffler formulate Koch's postulates on the causal relationship between microbes and diseases. Loeffler also discovers the causative organism for diphtheria, Corynebacterium diphtheriae.
 Ophthalmologist Karl Koller announces his use of a local anesthetic (cocaine) in surgery; Jellinek also demonstrates cocaine's effects as an anesthetic on the respiratory system.
 Friedrich Schultze first describes the disorder that will become known as Charcot–Marie–Tooth disease.
 Among the papers on brain function published by Vladimir Bekhterev is a study on the formation of the human conception of space.

Physics
 Ludwig Boltzmann derives the Stefan–Boltzmann law on blackbody radiant flux from thermodynamic principles.

Technology
 February 12 – Lewis Waterman gets his first patent for a capillary feed fountain pen in the United States.
 May 16 – Angelo Moriondo of Turin is granted a patent for an espresso machine.
 June 13 – LaMarcus Adna Thompson opens the "Gravity Pleasure Switchback Railway" at Coney Island, New York City.
 October – Hiram Maxim first demonstrates the Maxim gun, the first self-powered machine gun.
 Fall – Chester H. Pond invents the first electrical self-winding clock.
 Charles Renard and Arthur Constantin Krebs make a fully controllable free-flight in French Army airship La France with an electric motor.

Other events
 September 24 – Smeaton's Tower opened to the public on Plymouth Hoe as a monument to the history of civil engineering.
 October 22 – International Meridian Conference in Washington, D.C. fixes the Greenwich meridian as the world's prime meridian.
 Sophie Bryant becomes the first woman in England to be awarded the degree of Doctor of Science, by the University of London. Also in this year, she is the first woman to publish a paper with the London Mathematical Society.
 Sofia Kovalevskaya is appointed "Professor Extraordinarius" in mathematics at Stockholm University and becomes the editor of Acta Mathematica.

Awards
 Copley Medal: Carl Ludwig
 Wollaston Medal for Geology: Albert Jean Gaudry

Births
 January 26 – Edward Sapir (died 1939), Pomeranian-born anthropological linguist.
 January 28
 Auguste Piccard (died 1962), Swiss physicist and explorer.
 Jean Piccard (died 1963), Swiss-born chemist and explorer.
 March 24 – Chika Kuroda (died 1968), Japanese chemist.
 July 2 – Alfons Maria Jakob (died 1931), German neuropathologist.
 July 4 – Eleanor Williams (died 1963), Australian bacteriologist and serologist.
 February 23 – Casimir Funk (died 1967), Polish biochemist, coiner of the term vitamin.
 August 5 – Ludwik Hirszfeld (died 1954), Polish microbiologist and serologist.
 August 31 – George Sarton (died 1956), Flemish historian of science.
 November 8 – Hermann Rorschach (died 1922), Swiss psychiatrist.

Deaths
 January 6 – Gregor Mendel (born 1822), Silesian geneticist.
 February 7 – Johann Friedrich Julius Schmidt (born 1825), German astronomer.
 May 10 – Charles-Adolphe Wurtz (born 1817), Alsatian French chemist.
 May 12 – Robert Angus Smith (born 1817), British atmospheric chemist.
 May 13 – Cyrus McCormick (born 1809), American inventor.
 July 18 – Ferdinand von Hochstetter (born 1829), German geologist.
 July 20 – Sir Caesar Hawkins (born 1798), English surgeon.
 November 3 - Antoine Constant Saucerotte (born 1805), French physician
 November 11 – Alfred Brehm (born 1829), German zoologist.
 November 25 – Hermann Kolbe (born 1818), German chemist.

References

 
19th century in science
1880s in science